The 1938 Dartford by-election was held on 7 November 1938.  The by-election was held due to the death of the incumbent Conservative MP, Frank Edward Clarke.  It was won by the Labour candidate Jennie Adamson. Adamson afterwards stated that she won, because the voters "were ashamed of Mr. Chamberlain's betrayal of Czechoslovakia and of democracy."

References

1938 in England
Borough of Dartford
1938 elections in the United Kingdom
By-elections to the Parliament of the United Kingdom in Kent constituencies
1930s in Kent